Skate Nation is a British children's television programme presented by Sam Nixon and Mark Rhodes broadcast by CBBC on BBC Two in 2009. It was an eleven-part series in which fourteen teams of roller skaters competed for a trip to the World Games in Taiwan. Each team consisted of three children aged 7 – 13 and an adult.

The teams competed in one of two heats to reach the final ten, who attended a skate camp. From there eight team progressed to the studio shows, where each week one team was eliminated. Their performances in the stadium were judged by a panel consisting of Kevin Adams, Camilla Dallerup, and Asha Kirkby, as well as the studio audience. The two lowest-placed teams had to take part in the skate showdown, after which the judges voted to save one team.

The eleventh show showed the series winners in Taiwan and also the Skate Nation "Oscars". This was broadcast some time after the original series in January 2010.

The teams
Fourteen teams took part. The teams were made of skaters from many different disciplines and styles of roller skating.

There were six artistic roller skating teams: Three Blondes And A Baldy, Wheeled Wonders, Roller Rockets, Angels, Fab Four, and Blue Sherbert.

There were two roller hockey teams: Pirates (quads) and Slap Shots (inlines).

There were two speed skating teams: Rapid Rollers and Hypa Stry.k.

There was one aggressive skating team: Blades Of Glory.

There were two jam skating teams: Essence and Toe Jammers.

There was one freestyle team: Coast Bladers

Episode list

External links

BBC press release
Broadcast Now Article

BBC children's television shows
British reality television series
2009 British television series debuts
2010 British television series endings
English-language television shows